Des Duguid (6 November 1941 – 16 May 2008) was an Australian boxer. He competed in the men's welterweight event at the 1960 Summer Olympics.

References

1941 births
2008 deaths
Australian male boxers
Olympic boxers of Australia
Boxers at the 1960 Summer Olympics
People from Richmond, Victoria
Commonwealth Games medallists in boxing
Commonwealth Games bronze medallists for Australia
Boxers at the 1954 British Empire and Commonwealth Games
Welterweight boxers
Medallists at the 1954 British Empire and Commonwealth Games